George Alexander McLean (23 May 1885 – 31 October 1975) was a Liberal party member of the House of Commons of Canada. He was born in Mara Township, Ontario, and became an insurance agent and real estate broker by career.

McLean attended Orillia Collegiate, then attained a Bachelor of Arts at the University of Toronto. He served in World War I with the Canadian Expeditionary Force, 19th Battalion. He also served with the 21st Battalion (2nd Tyneside Scottish), Northumberland Fusiliers, achieving the rank of captain. In 1917, he sustained major injuries in battle.

From 1921 to 1924, McLean was a municipal councillor of Orillia, and from then the city's mayor until 1925.

He was first elected to Parliament at the Simcoe East riding in the 1935 general election after an unsuccessful campaign there in 1930. He was re-elected in 1940 and served a full second term and left federal politics at the 1945 election.

He died at Soldier's Memorial Hospital in Orillia in 1975.

References

External links
 

1885 births
Canadian military personnel of World War I
Liberal Party of Canada MPs
Mayors of places in Ontario
Members of the House of Commons of Canada from Ontario
Ontario municipal councillors
Politicians from Simcoe County
University of Toronto alumni
1975 deaths